Birgit Breuel (née Münchmeyer; born 7 September 1937 in Hamburg-Rissen) is a German politician, representative of the German Christian Democratic Union (CDU). She is the former President of the Treuhand Agency, and Commissioner General of the Expo 2000 in Hannover, and later worked in several honorary positions.

Birgit Münchmeyer came from a Lower Saxony family of traders and private bankers. She is the daughter of merchant bankers who owned the bank Münchmeyer & Co.. On 8 August 1959 she married the Hamburg merchant Ernst-Jürgen Breuel (born 7 October 1931 in Hamburg).

Birgit Breuel studied political science at the Universities of Hamburg, Oxford and Geneva. In 1966, she entered into the CDU. From 1978 to 1986 she was Minister of Economy and Transport in Lower Saxony, then to 1990 was the Lower Saxony Finance Minister. In 1990, Breuel was elected to the executive board of the Treuhand - a holding firm responsible for the sale of East German state assets. A year later she became the successor of Detlev Karsten Rohwedder. While Rohwedder had been cautious about the sale of most state assets, favouring a worker-owned solution if possible, Breuel favoured quick privatization. She departed in 1995 from this office.
Breuel then became Commissioner-General of the World Expo Expo 2000 in Hanover.

Literature 
 Birgit Breuel (Hg.): Ohne historisches Vorbild. Die Treuhandanstalt 1990 bis 1994 - eine kritische Würdigung. Berlin 2005  
 Deutsches Geschlechterbuch. Band 128 der Gesamtreihe (Hamburg Band 10), p. 69/70, C. A. Starke Verlag, Limburg (Lahn) 1962, .

See also
List of German Christian Democratic Union politicians

References

External links
 Christlich Demokratische Union Deutschlands web site
 Fem biography

Christian Democratic Union of Germany politicians
Ministers of the Lower Saxony State Government
1937 births
Living people
Alumni of the University of Oxford
Politicians from Hamburg
University of Geneva alumni
University of Hamburg alumni
Grand Crosses with Star and Sash of the Order of Merit of the Federal Republic of Germany